Avanhard Stadium is an abandoned football stadium in Pripyat, Ukraine. It was built to become the home ground of FC Stroitel Pripyat. Due to the Chernobyl disaster it was never realized. It was named, like several other grounds, after the Ukrainian sports society trade union. The town of Pripyat was evacuated following the Chernobyl disaster on 26 April 1986, which occurred a few kilometers away.

In popular culture
 Markiyan Kamysh's novel A Stroll to the Zone is about illegal tourist trips to Pripyat.
 In S.T.A.L.K.E.R.: Shadow of Chernobyl the Avanhard Stadium makes a minor appearance as the player exits Pripyat.
 The stadium also showed in the documentary television series Life After People (2008) as a part of the story of Pripyat.

Gallery

See also
Azure Swimming Pool
Chernobyl Exclusion Zone

References

External links

Sports venues in Kyiv Oblast
Buildings and structures in Pripyat
Chernobyl Exclusion Zone
Football venues in Ukraine
1979 establishments in Ukraine
Sports venues completed in 1979